Anxious Oswald Greene is a 2012 short Canadian adventure comedy written and directed by Marshall Axani. The film stars Ryan Beil, John Novak, Ellie Harvie, Trevor Devall, Jacqueline Robbins and Joyce Robbins. It was produced by Allude Entertainment.

Premise 

In a desperate attempt to cure his crippling anxiety, Oswald Greene visits a fantastical clinic to have his fate thrown into the hands of a blind nurse, a talking fly, and an eccentric doctor with a knack for rhyming.

Cast 
  Ryan Beil as Oswald
 John Novak as Dr. Revelstein
 Ellie Harvie as Nurse Pratchet
 Trevor Devall as The Fly (voice)
 Kelly Metzger as Ms. Fellows
 Jacqueline Robbins as Nicolina 
 Joyce Robbins as Nicotina

Awards 
 Hot Shots Shorts 2012:
 Short Film Award
 Whistler Film Festival 2013:
 Best Canadian Shortwork Award
 LA Comedy Festival 2014:
 Best Short Film
 Best Direction
 Vancouver Short Film Festival 2014:
 Best Cinematography
 Best Editing
 Best Sound Design
 Best Visual Effects

In 2014, the team won a record 13 Leo Awards of 15 nominations, the most awards a single program has ever won, including:
 Best Short Production Drama
 Best Direction, Short Drama
 Best Performance by a Male, Short Drama
 Best Screenwriting, Short Drama
 Best Cinematography, Short Drama
 Best Picture Editing, Short Drama
 Best Visual Effects, Short Drama
 Best Overall Sound, Short Drama
 Best Sound Editing, Short Drama
 Best Musical Score, Short Drama
 Best Production Design, Short Drama
 Best Make-Up, Short Drama
 Best Hairstyling, Short Drama
 Kaohsiung Film Festival 2014:
 Nominated Best Short Film
 Yorkton Film Festival 2014:
 Nominated Best Short Film

References

External links 
 Website
 

2012 fantasy films
Canadian fantasy films
2012 short films
2012 films
2010s English-language films
Canadian comedy short films
2010s Canadian films